In enzymology, a thiomorpholine-carboxylate dehydrogenase is an enzyme that catalyzes the chemical reaction

thiomorpholine 3-carboxylate + NAD(P)+  3,4-dehydro-thiomorpholine-3-carboxylate + NAD(P)H + H+

The 3 substrates of this enzyme are thiomorpholine 3-carboxylate, NAD+, and NADP+, whereas its 4 products are 3,4-dehydro-thiomorpholine-3-carboxylate, NADH, NADPH, and H+.

This enzyme belongs to the family of oxidoreductases, specifically those acting on the CH-NH group of donors with NAD+ or NADP+ as acceptor.  The systematic name of this enzyme class is thiomorpholine-3-carboxylate:NAD(P)+ 5,6-oxidoreductase. Other names in common use include ketimine reductase, and ketimine-reducing enzyme.

CRYM, a taxon-specific crystallin protein that also binds thyroid hormones has thiomorpholine-carboxylate dehydrogenase activity.

References

 

EC 1.5.1
NADPH-dependent enzymes
NADH-dependent enzymes
Enzymes of unknown structure